Jeronimas Kačinskas (or Kacinskas; 17 April 1907 – 15 September 2005) was a Lithuanian-born American composer.

Kačinskas was born in Viduklė, Kovno Governorate, Russian Empire, to the family of a church organist. He studied music at the National Conservatory of Lithuania in Klaipėda and at the Prague Conservatory. He later taught at the State Conservatory in Vilnius.  His Nonet was premiered in London in 1938, and he married Elena Šlevaitė in 1941.  In 1944, they escaped from Lithuania and travelled through Poland into Germany, where they were finally rescued by American troops.

In 1949, they arrived in the United States, and Kačinskas became a church organist and choirmaster in Boston, Massachusetts.  From 1967 to 1986, he taught at Berklee College of Music.

In 1991 he was awarded Lithuanian National Prize.

Works
Opera
 Juodas laivas (Black Ship) (1975); libretto by Algirdas Landsbergis

Orchestral
 Symphonic Fantasy No.1 (1940)
 Giesmė į šviesą (Hymn to Light), Symphonic Poem (1947)
 Atpirkimo misterija (Mystery of Redemption), Symphonic Poem (1956)
 Lento, Symphonic Poem (1957)
 Vilniaus siuita (Vilnius Suite) (1960)
 Symphonic Fantasy No.2 (1960)
 Transcendentinės išraiškos (Transcendental Expressions) for wind orchestra and organ (1964)
 Penki koncertiniai etiudai (Five Concert Etudes) for string orchestra (1989)

Concertante
 Concerto for trumpet and orchestra (1931)
 Concerto for flute and string orchestra (1962)

Chamber music
 String Quartet No.1 (1930)
 String Quartet No.2 (1931)
 Nonet for flute, oboe, clarinet, bassoon, horn, violin, viola, cello and double bass (1932)
 Trio No.1 for trumpet, viola and piano (1933)
 Trio No.2 Keturios miniatiūros (Four Miniatures) for flute, clarinet and cello (1958)
 Septet for clarinet, bassoon, horn, violin, viola, cello and piano (1959)
 Wind Quintet (1961)
 Saxophone Quartet No.1 (1967)
 Sonata for violin and piano (1974)
 Saxophone Quartet No.2 (1975)
 Introduction and Toccata for violin (1977)
 Trys liaudies dainos (Three Folk Songs) for clarinet, string quartet and piano (1977)
 Piano Quintet (1978)
 Lietuvoje (In Lithuania) for flute, violin, viola and cello (1980)
 Trio No.3 "Lietuviškas trio" (Lithuanian Trio) for flute, clarinet and viola (1980)
 Kamerinė fantazija (Chamber Fantasy) for flute, string quartet and piano (1981)
 Procesinė muzika (Processional Music) for 3 trumpets and organ (1982)
 Trio No.4 Lietuviška siuita (Lithuanian Suite) for flute, clarinet and bassoon (1983)
 Suite No.1 (Trio No.5) for flute, clarinet and bassoon (1985)
 Suite No.2 (Trio No.6) for violin, cello and piano (1986)
 Trio No.7 for violin, cello and piano (1987)
 Duo for violin and cello (1990)
 Variations for clarinet and piano (1991)
 String Quartet No.3 (1993)
 String Quartet No.4 (1997)
 2000 Year Anniversary of Jesus Christ's Holy Message to the People for horn, 3 trumpets, 3 trombones and tuba (2000)

Organ
 Improvisation (1968)
 Trumpa fantazija (Short Fantasy) (1969)
 Kontrastai (Contrasts) (1970)

Piano
 Variations (1929)
 Atspindžiai (Reflections) (1957)

Vocal
 Kaip aš buvau, sadulia (When I Was) for voice and piano
 Vai, lazdynai (Nut, Trees) for voice and piano
 Kad jau saulutė (The Sun Is Up) for voice and piano
 Tėviškės medžiai (Trees of Homeland) for voice and piano (1953); words by Kazys Bradūnas
 Audra (Storm) for voice and piano (1958); words by Pranas Lembertas
 Laivai palaužtom burėm (Boats with Broken Sails) for voice and piano or orchestra (1958); words by Stasys Santvaras
 Giesmė (Hymn) for baritone and piano (1960); words by Stasys Santvaras
 Lietuvos karalienė (Queen of Lithuania) for voice and piano (1965); words by E. Tumienė
 Aušra (Dawn) for voice and orchestra (1968); words by Kazys Bradūnas
 Nerimas (Anxiety) for voice and orchestra (1968); words by Leonas Andriekus
 Triptikas (Triptych) for soprano and orchestra (1968)
 Paslaptis (Mystery) for voice and piano or orchestra (1968); words by Kotryna Grigaitytė
 Trys liaudies dainos (Three Folk Songs) for voice and piano (1977)
 Nėra šalies tokios (No Such Land) for voice and piano (1980); words by Jonas Rūtenis
 Išjos sūnus (Son Will Ride Away) for voice, flute, 3 horns and piano (1987)
 Trys dainos (Three Songs) for voice and piano (1989)
 Rūpintojėlis (Sad God) for voice and piano (1991)
 Kur tavo dainos (Where Are Your Songs) for voice and piano (1994); words by Kazys Binkis
 Prabilkit stygos (Speak Up, Strings) for voice and piano (1996); words by Jurgis Tilvytis

Choral
 O, siela žmogaus (Oh, Soul of Man) for male chorus and organ; liturgical text
 Neapleisk mūsų (Do Not Abandon Us) for soprano and male chorus; liturgical text
 Malda (Prayer) for soprano, male chorus and organ; words by Stasys Liepas
 Marija (Maria) for mixed chorus; words by Pranas Lembertas
 Vargonai, gauskit (Organ, Play) for mixed chorus; liturgical text
 Mergele, Motin (Virgin, Mother) for mixed or male chorus; liturgical text
 O, Šventas Karalaiti (Oh, Blessed King) for soprano and male chorus; liturgical text
 Nebūk mums, Viešpatie, rūstus (Lord, Be Not Angry With Us) for male chorus; liturgical text
 Ave Maria for mixed or male chorus; liturgical text
 Rex Christe for mixed or female chorus; liturgical text
 Confirma Hoc for mixed or male chorus; liturgical text
 Šventa naktis (Holy Night) for mixed or male chorus; liturgical text
 Tykiai tykiai Nemunėlis teka (Quietly Flows the Nemunas River) for male chorus (1928)
 Sanctus for male chorus (1928); liturgical text
 Kur aš pasidėsiu (Where Will I Go) for mixed chorus (1928)
 Vilks papjovė (The Wolf Did It In) for mixed chorus (1928)
 Keleliu jojau (Riding on the Path) for male chorus (1928)
 Ant lygumėlio (On the Flat) for male chorus (1928)
 Rex for bass solo and male chorus (1928); words by Vincas Mykolaitis-Putinas
 Sutems tamsi naktužėlė (Dark Night Will Fall) for mixed chorus (1928)
 Varnas (The Raven) for mixed chorus (1929); words by Vincas Mykolaitis-Putinas
 Beržas (Birch Tree) for mixed chorus (1931); words by Juozas Tysliava
 Per girias (Through the Woods) for mixed chorus (1931); words by Balys Sruoga
 Pjovėjas (The Reaper) for mixed chorus (1931); words by Balys Sruoga
 Terra tremuit, Easter Hymn for mixed chorus or mixed chorus and organ (1932); liturgical text
 Ant temstančio tako (On the Darkening Path) for mixed chorus (1936)
 Gandrai (Storks) for mixed chorus (1938)
 Vinkšna (Elm Tree) for mixed chorus (1938)
 Daina (Song) for mixed chorus (1938)
 Oi, ūžė (The Murmur Came) for male chorus (1939)
 Nemunui (For the Nemunas River) for male chorus (1942)
 Missa brevis for male chorus (1945); liturgical text
 Lietuvos takeliai (Lithuanian Pathways) for mixed chorus (1946); words by Jurgis Baltrušaitis
 Esi, dangau (You Are, Heaven) for mixed chorus (1946); words by Bernardas Brazdžionis
 Žvangučiai (Bellflowers) for mixed chorus (1947); words by Jonas Aistis
 Suskambėjo (The Lyre Rang Out) for mixed or female chorus (1947); words by Motiejus Gustaitis
 Jau saulutė leidžias (The Sun Is Setting) for mixed chorus (1947)
 Didis, galingas (Great and Mighty) for mixed chorus (1948)
 Gimimo giesmė (Nativity Hymn) for mixed chorus (1950); words by Stasys Santvaras
 Missa in Honorem Immaculati Cordis Beate Mariae Virginis for soprano, alto, tenor and bass soli, mixed chorus, 3 trumpets, 3 trombones, tuba and organ (1951); liturgical text
 Kelionės daina (Travel Song) for female chorus (1953); Alfonsas Nyka-Niliūnas
 Rauda (Lament) for mixed chorus (1960); words by Jonas Aistis
 Te Deum laudamus for soprano, tenor, mixed chorus and organ (1965); liturgical text
 Šv. Stepono mišios (St. Stephen's Mass) for mixed chorus and organ (1966); liturgical text
 Gintarėlis (Little Amber) for mixed chorus (1968); words by Leonardas Andriekus
 Te lucis ante for mixed chorus and piano (or organ) (1977); liturgical text
 Oi, tai buvo (Oh, What Happened) for mixed chorus (1981)
 Haec Dies for mixed chorus and organ (or piano) (1981); liturgical text
 Haec Dies for mixed chorus, horn, 2 trumpets, 3 trombones, timpani and organ (1981); liturgical text
 Haec Dies for mixed chorus (1981); liturgical text
 Saulės giesmė (Hymn of the Sun) for baritone, mixed chorus and organ or orchestra (1982); words by St. Francis of Assisi
 Deus qui inter for mixed chorus and organ or 2 horns, 2 trumpets and trombone (1983); liturgical text
 Ateities giesmė (Hymn of the Future) for soprano, bass, mixed chorus and piano or orchestra (1986); words by Bernardas Brazdžionis
 Vidurnakčio tyla (Midnight Silence) for male chorus (1991); words by Jonas Aistis
 Baltija (The Baltic Sea) for mixed chorus and orchestra (1993); words by Paulius Jurkus
 Asperges me for mixed chorus and organ (1993); liturgical text
 Mišios Šventosios Dvasios garbei (Mass in Honour of Holy Spirit), Missa brevis for mixed chorus and organ (1995); liturgical text
 Mišios Švenčiausios Jėzaus Širdies garbei (Mass in Honour of Jesus' Holy Heart), Missa brevis for male chorus and organ (1996); liturgical text
 Credo for mixed chorus, 2 trumpets, 2 trombones and organ (1999); liturgical text
 Credo for mixed chorus (1999); liturgical text
 Jesu Dulcis for mixed chorus (2001); liturgical text

References
Lithuanian Music Information and Publishing Centre, accessed 13 July 2009

External links
Jeronimas Kačinskas at the Lithuanian Music Information and Publishing Centre
Berklee Beat biographical article

1907 births
2005 deaths
People from Raseiniai District Municipality
People from Kovno Governorate
20th-century classical composers
Lithuanian classical composers
Lithuanian emigrants to the United States
American male classical composers
American classical composers
American music educators
American opera composers
Male opera composers
Recipients of the Lithuanian National Prize
20th-century American composers
20th-century American male musicians